The Princess Diaries is a series of epistolary young adult novels written by Meg Cabot, and is also the title of the first volume, published in 2000. The series spent 48 weeks on the New York Times Children's Series Best Sellers List. The series revolves around Amelia 'Mia' Thermopolis, a teenager in New York who discovers that she is the princess of a small European principality called Genovia. The series follows Mia's life throughout high school in the 2000s and juggling regular teenage life with being a royal princess.
The books are noted for containing many popular culture references from the 2000s that influence some of the plot.

Meg Cabot quotes the series' inspiration on her website stating: "I was inspired to write The Princess Diaries when my mom, after the death of my father, began dating one of my teachers; they later went on to get married just as Mia's mom does in the book! I have always had a 'thing' for princesses (my parents used to joke that when I was smaller, I did a lot of insisting that my 'real' parents, the king and queen, were going to come get me soon, and that everyone had better start being a lot nicer to me) so I stuck a princess in the book just for kicks... and voilà! The Princess Diaries was born."

The latest published book in the series, The Princess Diaries, Volume XI: Royal Wedding was released in 2015 following the launch of a spin-off series for tweens. Mia's half-sister Olivia made her debut in From the Notebooks of a Middle School Princess, released in May 2015. A new book, The Quarantine Princess Diaries, is scheduled to be published in March 2023.

Setting

The series is set primarily in the Manhattan borough of New York City. Some books take place in Genovia, a fictional European country. Genovia is a principality between France and Spain ruled by Mia's father, Prince Philippe Renaldi, and by Mia's grandmother, Dowager Princess Clarisse Renaldi.

Characters

Mia Thermopolis
Amelia Mignonette Thermopolis Grimaldi Renaldo (Amelia Mignonette Thermopolis Renaldi in the Movies), Princess of Genovia is the protagonist of the series. She is the daughter of Helen Thermopolis, a painter, and Philippe Renaldo, the crown prince of Genovia. Mia is also the current Princess Regent of Genovia.

Mia is sometimes shy and has a down-to-earth personality, though on occasion Mia shows herself to be quite sarcastic and sly. Throughout the series she is very self-critical of herself, describing herself as flat-chested, taller than most girls at 5-foot-9, and with embarrassingly large feet. She also has a tendency to over-analyze things and worry too much. 

In Disney's The Princess Diaries 2001, Mia (who was portrayed by Anne Hathaway) is aged 15, unlicensed, and owns a 1965 Mustang. She has similar qualities, but her father dies two months prior to where the movie begins, and her last name is Renaldi instead of Renaldo. She lives in San Francisco instead of New York.

Clarisse Marie Grimaldi Renaldo, Dowager Princess of Genovia
Clarisse Maria was formally known as Clarisse Marie Grimaldi Renaldo, Dowager Princess of Genovia.

Clarisse is the dowager princess of Genovia and Mia's paternal grandmother. Mia refers to her as "Grand-mère" (French for "Grandmother"). As a young woman, she married Prince Rupert Renaldi and had two sons. She speaks French most of the time, but she can also speak English; however, she disdains English as a vulgar language. She is almost always accompanied by her miniature poodle, Rommel, who is notable for having a severe case of OCD that causes him to lick his own fur off. She smokes often and enjoys drinking sidecars. She is not hesitant about lying or manipulating others in order to get her own way.

Lilly Moscovitz

Mia's best friend since kindergarten, Lilly is a highly intelligent and opinionated person who has her own public-access television show, titled Lilly Tells It Like It Is, in which she discusses political and social issues. By the end of the series, her TV show is picked up by a network and is apparently very popular in South Korea. Lilly is not considered to be very pretty; Mia often describes her face as being "squashed in like a pug's". However, she has a well-developed figure.

In the 2001 Disney Movie, Lilly, portrayed by Heather Matarazzo, is portrayed as intelligent, confident, and socially conscious. Her talk show is called "Shut Up and Listen". She is then a student at Berkeley. In The Princess Diaries 2: Royal Engagement, Mia appoints Lilly as her royal secretary.

Michael Moscovitz
Lilly's older brother, and Mia's main love interest throughout the series. Michael has brown eyes and thick, dark hair and is tall. Mia insists that he is the third best-looking guy at AEHS after Josh Richter and Justin Baxendale and describes his nose as aquiline, mouth as "eminently kissable", and neck as aromatic due to an intoxicating blend of Tide from his shirt collar, his Gillette shaving foam, and Ivory soap. Though he often clashes with his younger sister, Michael and Lilly are in fact close siblings and friends. He used to run his own webzine, Crackhead,  but had to disband it after an editorial stating the merits of Linux over Windows, which caused a loss of advertisers and funds. Shortly after this, Michael starts a band called Skinner Box (a name suggested by Mia) with a few friends, including Boris Pelkowski.

Tina Hakim Baba 
A student at AEHS, Tina is the daughter of a Saudi Arabian oil sheik and a British former supermodel. Because of her father's status, she has to have the protection of a bodyguard, Wahim, which isolates her from the other students until Mia sits with her after a fight with Lilly in the first novel.

Secondary characters
 Lars van der Hooten: Mia's very protective Swedish bodyguard.
 Helen Thermopolis: Mia's mother. She has a career as an artist and spends most of her time in her studio.
 Frank Gianini: Mia's algebra and homeroom teacher. He dates her mother, Helen, and marries her when she becomes pregnant with Mia's half-brother, Rocky.
 John Paul "J.P." Reynolds Abernathy IV: Initially known as "The Guy Who Hates It When They Put Corn In the Chili", J.P. meets Mia via Grand-mère's school musical in Party Princess.
 Boris Pelkowski: A Russian violin virtuoso, and Lilly's boyfriend. His habits include tucking his sweater into his pants, breathing through his mouth, and playing the violin in Gifted and Talented class, when everyone else wants him to be quiet.
 Josh Richter: Lana Weinberger's boyfriend. He is on the crew team and is co-valedictorian.
 Lana Weinberger: A popular junior cheerleader with long blonde hair, a peaches-and-cream complexion, baby blue eyes and a voluptuous figure

Volumes

The Princess Diaries, October 2000  
The Princess Diaries, Volume II: Princess in the Spotlight, June 2001 - a.k.a. - Take Two
The Princess Diaries, Volume III: Princess in Love, March 2002 - a.k.a. - Third Time Lucky
The Princess Diaries, Volume IV: Princess in Waiting, April 2003 - a.k.a. - Mia goes Fourth
The Princess Diaries, Volume IV and 1/2: Project Princess, August 2003 
The Princess Diaries, Volume V: Princess in Pink, March 2004 - a.k.a. - Give me Five
The Princess Diaries, Volume VI: Princess in Training, March 2005 - a.k.a. - Six Appeal or Sixsational
The Princess Diaries, Volume VI and 1/2: The Princess Present, October 2005
The Princess Diaries, Volume VII: Party Princess, March 2006 - a.k.a. - Seventh Heaven 
The Princess Diaries, Volume VII and 1/2: Sweet Sixteen Princess, May 2006
The Princess Diaries, Volume VII and 3/4: Valentine Princess, published December 2006, but chronologically fits here, being presented as an old journal Mia finds of her Freshman Valentine's Day two years after the fact.
The Princess Diaries, Volume VIII: Princess on the Brink, January 2007 - a.k.a. - After Eight
The Princess Diaries, Volume IX: Princess Mia, December 26, 2007 - a.k.a. - To the Nines
The Princess Diaries, Volume X: Forever Princess, January 2009 - a.k.a. - Ten out of Ten
The Princess Diaries, Volume XI: Royal Wedding, June 2, 2015
The Quarantine Princess Diaries,  coming March 2023 
Illustrated by Chelsey McLaren:
 Princess Lessons, March 2003
 Perfect Princess, March 2004
 Holiday Princess, November 2005
Ransom My Heart by Princess of Genovia Mia Thermopolis

Awards and nominations

 2001 American Library Association Best Books for Young Adults
 2001 American Library Association Quick Pick for Reluctant Young Adult Readers
 2001 New York Public Library Book for the Teen Age
 2002 International Reading Association/Children's Book Council Young Adults' Choice
 2002–2003 Volunteer State Book Award (Tennessee)
 2003 Evergreen Young Adult Book Award (Washington)
 2021 Time Magazine’s 100 Best YA Books of All Time

Adaptations
In 2001 and 2004 respectively, two films based on the novels were produced by Walt Disney Pictures, The Princess Diaries and The Princess Diaries 2: Royal Engagement starring Anne Hathaway and Julie Andrews respectively as Mia Thermopolis and Clarisse Renaldi. Cabot has thanked the films many times in interviews and on her website because she believes that they helped boost her book sales, as well as making her the success that she is today. The first season of the Netflix adult animated comedy series Q-Force features Stephanie Beatriz as Mira Popadopolous, based on Mia Thermopolis, whose backstory adapts the events of The Princess Diaries.

See also

Princess Charlotte, Duchess of Valentinois (1898–1977): the illegitimate daughter of Louis II, Prince of Monaco, later legitimized as his legal heiress; mother of Rainier III, Prince of Monaco.
Jazmin Grace Grimaldi (1992–present): the illegitimate daughter of Albert II, Prince of Monaco, born and living in the U.S.
Republic of Genoa: a historical republic bearing geographical and cultural similarities to the fictional modern Genovia.
Ruritanian romance: a genre of stories set in a fictional country.

References

 Cabot, Meg (2001). The Princess Diaries. New York, New York. HarperTrophy. .
 Cabot, Meg (2006). The Princess Diaries, Volume VII: Party Princess. New York, New York. HarperCollins. .

Footnotes

External links 
 Official site of Meg Cabot
 Official site of Mia Thermopolis

 
Book series introduced in 2000
American young adult novels
Young adult novel series
Fictional diaries
 
HarperCollins books
Vegetarianism in fiction